The Quest of Life is a 1916 American drama silent film directed by Ashley Miller and written by Gabrielle Enthoven, Edmund Goulding and Ashley Miller. The film stars Florence Walton, Julian L'Estrange, Royal Byron, Daniel Burke and Russell Bassett. The film was released on September 25, 1916, by Paramount Pictures.

Plot

Cast 
Florence Walton as Ellen Young
Julian L'Estrange as Alec Mapleton
Royal Byron as Percy
Daniel Burke as Baronti
Russell Bassett as Ellen's father
Maurice Mouvet as Maurice Breton

References

External links 
 

1916 films
1910s English-language films
Silent American drama films
1916 drama films
Paramount Pictures films
American black-and-white films
American silent feature films
1916 lost films
Lost drama films
1910s American films